A curry beef turnover or curry puff is a type of Chinese pastry.

The pastry is shaped in a half-moon crescent. It has curry beef filling in the center and is also crunchy on the outside. The outer shell is crispy and flaky. It is one of the standard pastries in Hong Kong. They are also available in Chinese bakeries.

See also
Curry puff, Southeast Asian pastry
Samosa
Crab rangoon
List of pastries

References

Taiwanese cuisine
Beef dishes
East Asian curries
Savoury pies
Hong Kong cuisine
Chinese pastries
Curry dishes